The 2015–16 Macedonian Football Cup was the 24th season of Macedonia's football knockout competition. Rabotnichki are the defending champions, having won their fourth title in the previous year.

Competition calendar

First round
The Matches were  played on 12 and 13 August 2015.

|colspan="3" style="background-color:#97DEFF" align=center|12 August 2015

|-
|colspan="3" style="background-color:#97DEFF" align=center|13 August 2015

|}
1The match was awarded to Makedonija Gjorche Petrov because as the Vulkan players not showing at the pitch in the second half, when they were leading 2–0 after the first half.

Second round
Entering this round are the 16 winners from the First Round. The draw was held on 1 September 2015. The first legs were played on 30 September and the second legs were played on 21 October 2015.

|}

Quarter-finals
Entering this round are the 8 winners from the Second Round. The first legs were played on 25 and 26 November and the second legs were played on 2 December 2015.

|}

Semi-finals
The first legs were played on 2 March 2016 and the return legs on 13 April 2016.

Summary

|}

Matches

Shkëndija won 4–1 on aggregate.

Rabotnichki won 4–1 on aggregate.

Final

See also
2015–16 Macedonian First Football League
2015–16 Macedonian Second Football League
2015–16 Macedonian Third Football League

References

External links
 Official Website

Macedonia
Cup
Macedonian Football Cup seasons